Amer Alrjoub (born April 13, 1981), also written as Amer Al-Rjoub (Arabic: عامر الرجوب) is a Jordanian television personality based in Amman, Jordan. He began his television career in 2011 as an anchor and presenter on Orient News and is currently one of the leading media personalities in Jordan through the Jordanian television channel Al-Mamlakah. His large social media presence has given him a celebrity status in Jordan and the Middle East. He is sometimes compared to an Arabic version of Larry King.

Early life 
Amer Alrjoub was born in 1981 in the village of As-Sarih, Irbid Governorate, Jordan. He graduated in 2003 from Yarmouk University with a degree in journalism. He is the first in his family to become a media figure.

Career

Work in media 
The first major television show that Alrjoub presented was Details or Tafaseel ( Arabic: تفاصيل) with Orient News (Arabic: تلفزيون أورينت ). As a result, Alrjoub became a well-known television presenter in Jordan and Syria. He worked with Orient News for a total of seven years as a presenter, anchor, and analyst. He simultaneously worked as a radio presenter with the Jordan News Channel in "The Voice of the Kingdom" (Arabic: صوت المملكة). After that, he joined the Jordanian television channel, Al-Mamlakah (Arabic: قناة المملكة), where he is the presenter of the popular political show "The Voice of the Kingdom" (Arabic: صوت المملكة).

Social media 
Alrjoub commands a large social media presence on Twitter, Facebook, and Instagram, making him one of the most well-known Jordanian media personalities.

His landmark statement is kul al-tahaya "All the Salutes" (Arabic: كل التحايا). This is commonly used by his fans and followers as well. 

He is also well known of his Haurani accent, commonly spoken in northern Jordan and southern Syria.

Views 
Alrjoub is a strong supporter of King Abduallah II of Jordan based on several photos he posted with the king. Alrjoub's views on political issues are mostly inferred from his television programs. He supported the Syrian Revolution and was an avid supporter of the rights of Syrian refugees. He is vocal against corruption in the Arab World. He supports women's rights. He also supports the rights of Palestinians and Palestinian Refugees. He was also one of several Jordanian celebrities who received the COVID vaccine live on air to encourage others to do the same.

References

External links 
 https://twitter.com/amerrjob
 https://digsty.com/amer.alrjoub

1981 births
Jordanian television people
People from Irbid Governorate
Yarmouk University alumni
Living people